Face is a 2004 Korean horror film directed by Yoo Sang-gon.

Plot
Lee Hyun-min, who works reconstructing faces from skulls, quits his work in an institute to stay with his Beta-allergic daughter Jin that was submitted to a transplant of heart by the specialist Dr. Yoon. The newcomer researcher to the institute, Jung Sun-young, comes to his house with the skull of a victim of a serial-killer that had her whole body melted down with acid. At first, Hyun-min refuses the assignment, but he is haunted by the ghost of the victim, and scared, he decides to reconstruct the face of the woman. When Jin has trouble with the transplanted heart, Hyun-min requests the donor case history to Dr. Yoon, but the doctor refuses to give the information, claiming confidentiality issues. Dr. Yoon becomes the prime suspect of Detective Suh, who is in charge of the investigation of the murder cases, and he discloses the identity of the victim based on the reconstructed face. Meanwhile, Hyun-min has a premonition and finds another skull buried a long time ago below the sand in a field. He reconstructs the face, unraveling a supernatural secret.

Cast
Song Yoon-ah ... Jung Sun-young 
Shin Hyun-joon ... Lee Hyun-min 
Kim Seung-wook ... Detective Seo
Ahn Suk-hwan ... Ph.D. Yoon
Jo Won-hee ... Kim Han-soo
Song Jae-ho ... Department head Song
Han Ye-rin ... Lee-jin
Jang Suk-won ... Dong-chul
Hong Soo-ah ... Jo Hye-ran
Oh Jung-se .. Min-ho
Shin Cheol-jin ... Police officer Son
Lee Joo-shil ... Hyun-min's mother
Kwak Min-seok ... doctor 1
Lee Cheol-min ... Detective Jo

See also
 List of Korean-language films

References

External links
 

2004 films
2004 horror films
South Korean horror films
2000s Korean-language films
2000s South Korean films